Wynn Coggins is an American civil servant who served as the acting Assistant Secretary for Administration for the United States Department of Commerce and served as the acting United States Deputy Secretary of Commerce from March 3, 2021 until her successor Don Graves was sworn in on May 14, 2021. She served as the acting United States Secretary of Commerce from January 20, 2021 to March 3, 2021 when Gina Raimondo was sworn in.

Education 
Coggins has a bachelor's degree in civil engineering from Clemson University and a Master of Science in information systems technology with a concentration in information resources management from the George Washington University School of Business.

Acting Secretary of Commerce 
On January 20, 2021, following the inauguration of President Joe Biden, Coggins was selected to serve as acting United States secretary of commerce, pending the confirmation of nominee Gina Raimondo by the United States Senate.

Acting Deputy Secretary of Commerce 
On March 3, 2021, Coggins began to serve as acting United States deputy secretary of commerce.

References 

|-

Biden administration cabinet members
Clemson University alumni
George Washington University alumni
Living people
United States Department of Commerce officials
Year of birth missing (living people)